La Recueja is a municipality in La Manchuela county, province of Albacete at Castile-La Mancha, Spain. It has a population of 330. It is located in the Júcar riverside.

Information
 www.LaRecueja.com

Municipalities of the Province of Albacete